Rod Cason (born February 9, 1950) is a former American football offensive tackle.  He played college football at Angelo State University in San Angelo, Texas from 1969-1971 where he was named twice named Associated Press "Second Team All-America" as well as being the first player named First Team NAIA All-America honors three consecutive times. He was elected to the College Football Hall of Fame in 2002.  He was selected in the 11th round of the NFL draft by the New England Patriots in 1972.

References 

1950 births
Living people
People from San Angelo, Texas
American football offensive tackles
Angelo State Rams football players
College Football Hall of Fame inductees
Players of American football from Texas